Martin Luther's Death House is an historic building in Eisleben, Saxony-Anhalt Germany, long regarded as the place where the influential theologian Martin Luther died on 18 February 1546. Along with Martin Luther's Birth House in Eisleben and other sites associated with Martin Luther in Wittenberg, the building was inscribed on the UNESCO World Heritage List in 1996. It is now a museum.

History 
Luther travelled on 23 January 1546 from Halle to Eisleben on a mission to solve an inheritance dispute in the House of Mansfeld. This mediation was protracted and in the meantime Luther was tormented by cramps in his chest.
Luther anticipated his death many days beforehand because he was increasingly suffering many heart attacks. By 17 February 1546 the inheritance dispute had finally been resolved and at dinner that day Luther commented he would finally lie down to sleep in his coffin and allow the worms to have a good meal. The pain in his chest continued to worsen and many medications were tried on him, but to no avail. It was claimed that in his last hours more than twenty people were with him, including his son Paul Luther. The theologian Justus Jonas documented the version of his death accepted by Luther's followers. According to this version, Luther recited prayers, begged the Lord to take his soul and then his senses faded. 
On 18 February 1546, Luther died at the age of 62 years. The reason for his death is assumed to be a cardiac infarct.

The question of how Martin Luther died became essential to the fate of the Protestant Reformation. The Roman Catholic church preached that the manner of death attests the life and that the devil uses the last moments of life as his last chance to tempt the individual. Immediately after Luther's death, Catholic pamphlets spread rapidly, alleging that Luther had drunk himself to death with alcohol. One of his retainers, Ambrosio Kudtfeld, attested that he had hanged himself, and some of the details he gave of Luther's appearance were corroborated. The site of Luther's last rest became a place of worship for the faithful of the Protestant religion and they went on pilgrimages to the house until this was banned in 1707.

Restoration and reopening 
In February 2013 the building was reopened, after two years of major restoration and extension of the museum costing 5.8 million euros. A new exhibition, "Luthers letzter Weg" (in English: Luther's last path), now chronicles his decease and reveals Luther's attitude to death. Now for the first time in history, it is possible for visitors to explore all chambers of the building. The new exhibition contains about 110 exhibits, including historic furniture, documents and signatures, as well as the original cloth that covered Luther's coffin.

Unfortunately in 2013 it became clear that in 1726 the chronicler Eusibius Francke confused the site of the houses of Barthel Drachstedt and of his father Dr. Philipp Drachstedt. The consequence of this mistake was that in 1862 the town of Eisleben took over the "false" house. In 1892 the house was almost completely rebuilt in order to reflect what was believed to be its appearance at the time of Luther's death, even down to a reconstruction of the supposed room of his death.

It is now known that in fact Luther died in a house at Am Markt 56, which is currently occupied by the 'Hotel Graf Mansfeld'.

This mistake is rather unfortunate as a considerable sum of money has been invested in building the Luther 'Sterbe Haus' Museum at what is now known to be the wrong site. The Hotel Graf Mansfeld in turn has no desire to become a museum or a pilgrimage site. On the other hand, Protestants are not urging it to become one, and there is not much of an ongoing dispute about the matter.

Museum 
From November until March the museum is open from Tuesday to Sunday (it is closed on Monday), from 10am—5pm. From April until October the museum is open on all days of the week, from 10am—6pm .

See also 
 Martin Luther's Birth House

References

External links 
 Die Stiftung Luthergedenkstätten in Sachsen-Anhalt
 Lutherstiftung
 Chronological catalog of Luther's life events, letters, and works with citations, 478 pages, 5.45 MB LettersLuther4.doc

Luther
Eisleben
Historic house museums in Germany
Literary museums in Germany
Martin Luther
World Heritage Sites in Germany